Hechtia reticulata is a species of plant in the genus Hechtia. This species is endemic to Mexico.

References

reticulata
Flora of Mexico